The Lost World is a 1995 science fiction action novel written by Michael Crichton, and the sequel to his 1990 novel Jurassic Park. It is his tenth novel under his own name and his twentieth overall, and it was published by Knopf. A paperback edition followed in 1996. In 1997, both novels were re-published as a single book titled Michael Crichton's Jurassic World, which is unrelated to the 2015 film of the same name.

Plot summary
In August 1993, four years after the disaster at Jurassic Park, chaos theorist and mathematician Ian Malcolm - who is revealed to have survived the events of the previous novel - encounters and reluctantly agrees to team up with wealthy paleontologist Richard Levine. The two men attempt to search for a "lost world" of dinosaurs following rumors of strange animal corpses washing up on the shores of Costa Rica.  They learn of Site B on Isla Sorna, the "production facility" where the now-defunct company InGen hatched and grew the dinosaurs for their Jurassic Park theme park on nearby Isla Nublar.

Eighteen months later, afraid that the Costa Rican government will find Isla Sorna and destroy the dinosaurs, Levine hastily embarks on an expedition to the island without Malcolm. He arrives with a Costa Rican guide named Diego, but shortly after arriving, the two are attacked by two mysterious creatures later identified as a pair of Carnotaurus who kill Diego. Eventually, Malcolm learns that Levine has gone missing there. Malcolm then goes to the island with a rescue team consisting of Jack "Doc" Thorne, an engineer and retired university professor; Eddie Carr, Thorne's assistant; and two stowaway children, R. B. "Arby" Benton and Kelly Curtis, who were working as Levine's research assistants. Dr. Sarah Harding, an ethologist and close friend of Malcolm, is also approached to join the expedition. Though she is initially unsure, she ultimately decides to meet them there.

The group arrives on the island with weapons and a conjoined pair of heavily modified, specially equipped RV trailers that serve as a mobile laboratory. They find and explore a geothermal powered complex of abandoned InGen buildings, including a worker village and a laboratory. They also eventually find Levine, who is overjoyed at the trove of information he can glean from this "lost world" and is ungrateful for being rescued. Benton wakes up first and manages to gain access to the old InGen LAN network, allowing them to view the island by built-in cameras.

Simultaneously, another group - consisting of geneticist Lewis Dodgson and his assistant Howard King, and "celebrity" biologist George Baselton - learns of Levine's expedition and travels to Isla Sorna independently. The new group plans to steal dinosaur eggs for Biosyn, the rival company of InGen responsible for the sabotage that led to the Jurassic Park disaster. As they are about to leave, they encounter Harding and offer to give her a boat ride to Isla Sorna. However, just as they approach the island, Dodgson attempts to kill her by shoving her off the boat. She survives, though, and manages to meet up with Malcolm's group on the island.

Levine and Malcolm make many observations of the dinosaurs' behavior from the "high hide", an enclosed blind that is set above the ground on scaffolding. They soon learn that Dodgson's group has arrived on the island. Meanwhile, Dodgson's group is attacked by a pair of Tyrannosaurus as they try to steal eggs from the animals' nest, resulting in Baselton's death due to him giving inaccurate information regarding a Tyrannosaurus' vision. Dodgson and King become separated after the attack.

Later, while inspecting the T. rex nest, Malcolm finds that one of the infants had been injured and has a broken leg. He instructs Eddie to kill it because it has no chance of surviving in the wild. Unbeknownst to the group, Eddie refuses to kill the injured animal and brings it back to the trailers. When the group discovers the animal, Malcolm and Harding begrudgingly agree to set a cast around its leg while the rest of the group returns to the high hide. As night approaches, the nocturnal Velociraptors emerge from the jungle and kill King as he tries to escape. As Malcolm and Harding finish setting the T. rex leg, the parents come looking for their infant and attack the trailers, pushing one of them over a cliff and injuring Malcolm. Thorne rescues Malcolm and Harding, while the raptors attack the high hide and kill Eddie, despite Levine's assurance. Malcolm is injected with a high dosage of morphine which relaxes him, though not without causing him to hallucinate as he had in the first novel. Arby, trapped in a survival cage, is kidnapped by the raptors but is later rescued by Thorne, Kelly and Harding retrieving the key to the cage.

The group later takes refuge from the raptors in the general store of the old InGen worker village. The group attempts to formulate a plan to reach the landing site where the helicopter is set to meet them in the morning. When Thorne ventures out into the village to search for fuel, he survives an encounter with the pair of chameleon-like Carnotaurus. Levine and Harding drive the Carnotaurus away by shining their lights on them and making them change their skin patterns too fast. Levine becomes irrational and Harding and Thorne have to talk him down.

The next morning, Harding heads out to recover one of the team's vehicles that Thorne had left behind while saving her and Malcolm from the trailer, as it may be the only vehicle large enough to carry everyone to the rendezvous point. Upon finding it, she encounters Dodgson attempting to steal the vehicle for himself. Suddenly, an adult T. rex approaches them, and they both hide under the car. Harding pushes Dodgson back out, and the T. rex picks him up, carries him to its nest, and feeds him to her offspring. Harding sets out to reach the helicopter before it can take off without the group, but she finds she is too late. Eventually, Kelly discovers a boat docked on the island, and she finds a tunnel, allowing the group to reach it just as the raptors finally break into the general store. 

As the group sails away, Malcolm and Harding reveal information that he discovered in the laboratory: during Site B's active years, InGen fed the young carnivorous dinosaurs sheep extract infected with prions, which cause a disease that shortens the dinosaurs' lifespans and infect their brains. Although the scientists contained the disease, it began to spread once again after they abandoned the island. Malcolm and Harding say that the disease will lead to the eventual extinction of the dinosaurs on Isla Sorna. Despite this, Thorne declares that the fact that they are all alive and that they are returning home is really all that matters. Malcolm notes mankind's destructive habits are far more destructive to the earth than nature's.

Background
After the publication of Jurassic Park in 1990, Crichton was pressured by fans to write a sequel. Following the success of Jurassic Park film adaptation in 1993, director Steven Spielberg became interested in making a sequel film. Crichton had never written a sequel to any of his novels before and was initially hesitant to do so. He claimed a sequel was "a very difficult structural problem because it has to be the same but different; if it's really the same, then it's the same—and if it's really different, then it's not a sequel. So it's in some funny intermediate territory". Finally, in March 1994, Crichton claimed there would probably be a sequel novel as well as a film adaptation, stating that he had an idea for the novel's story.

Although the character of Ian Malcolm was suggested to have died in the first novel, Crichton chose to bring him back for the sequel: "Malcolm came back because I needed him. I could do without the others, but not him because he is the 'ironic commentator' on the action. He keeps telling us why it will go bad. And I had to have him back again". Bringing a dead character back was an idea Crichton got from Arthur Conan Doyle, who did the same with his character Sherlock Holmes. Malcolm was also considered a favorite character among readers of the first novel and people who watched its film adaptation. An early draft of the novel included a lengthy tirade by Malcolm regarding God and evolution, but Crichton removed it "because it just didn't seem to fit".

In March 1995, Crichton announced that he was nearly finished writing the novel, with a scheduled release for later that year. At the time, Crichton declined to specify the novel's title or plot. Crichton later stated that the novel's title is an homage to Doyle's 1912 novel of the same name, as well as the 1925 film adaptation of Doyle's novel, also titled The Lost World. Crichton's novel also shares some story similarities with Doyle's novel, as they both involve an expedition to an isolated Central American location where dinosaurs roam. However, in Crichton's novel, the dinosaurs were recreated by genetic engineering, rather than surviving from antiquity. The Lost World was the only book sequel Crichton ever wrote.

Reception 
The Lost World spent eight weeks as number one on the New York Times Best Seller List, from October 8, 1995, to November 26, 1995, and it remained on the list as late as March 1996.

People wrote: "Action-packed and camera-ready, The Lost World is to its predecessor what microwave dinners are to home-cooked meals: hardly authentic, but in a pinch fully satisfying". The magazine wrote that "the odd reappearance of Ian Malcolm, when other key characters from the original have been dropped, makes one wonder if only Jeff Goldblum was available to appear in the movie sequel. But even at his most calculating—incorporating two urchins, crafting a feminist hero—the author pleases. Characteristically clever, fast-paced and engaging, Michael Crichton's latest work accomplishes what he set out to do: offer the still-harrowing thrills of a by-now-familiar ride".

Michiko Kakutani of The New York Times gave the novel a negative review and called it a "tired rehash" of Jurassic Park. Kakutani wrote that the novel lacked the "surprise or ingenuity" of its predecessor, calling it "so predictable and unimaginative that it seems to have been intended to save special-effects technicians the hassle of doing new work on the movie sequel". Kakutani said the novel represented "a new low" in Crichton's "attention to character", and criticized the character of Ian Malcolm in particular: "Except for complaining about the injuries he suffered in 'Jurassic Park', Malcolm makes virtually no reference to his previous visit to dino-land [...]. Instead of even making a half-hearted attempt to turn Malcolm into a reasonable facsimile of a person, Mr. Crichton cynically uses him as a mouthpiece for all sorts of portentous techno-babble about chaos theory, extinction theories and mankind's destructive nature. As for the other characters, they are each given handy labels for easy identification".

Tom De Haven of Entertainment Weekly gave the novel a "B−" rating and wrote that it "is like a videogame in prose—a few hundred frantic pages of run, hide, kill, and die. Over and over again". De Haven criticized the lack of characterization and wrote that Crichton was "clearly off his stride here, right from the start. Without any need to build scientific plausibility into the plot (he did that last time, beautifully), Crichton seems unengaged by his own material, distanced from it, and his cautionary lectures about extinction and natural selection seem halfhearted attempts to legitimize his return to familiar territory. But if there's a lack of freshness to the novel (even the title isn't new; it's borrowed from the granddaddy of all dinosaur tales, by Arthur Conan Doyle), it is still a very scary read".

De Haven felt that the novel's opening chapters were "rushed and contrived. Although it's perhaps a deliberate, affectionate nod to the old let's-get-going-so-we-can-get-to-the-good-parts kind of storytelling that was such a staple of 1950s monster movies, it's still cheesy. [...] No matter how feeble the premise, though, or how shallow the characterizations, I wouldn't dream of talking anybody out of reading the novel. For clarity, terror, and sheer grisliness, the action far surpasses anything in the original book; even better, the suspense is masterfully stretched out, then released all of a sudden—just when you least expect it". De Haven concluded that its predecessor "has earned a secure place for itself in the history of popular American literature. The Lost World, at best, will be a footnote. But still, it made my palms sweat".

Neal Karlen of the Los Angeles Times wrote that Crichton "has done the sequel step just right, keeping the tropes of the earlier novel familiar for the fans while changing the ideas and story line enough to keep even his severest and most envious critics turning the pages to find out what happens next". Karlen noted that, "Once again, the dinosaurs seem the real stars", while writing that the human characters "are introduced as if in shorthand screenplay form". Karlen especially praised the novel's raptors, calling them "seemingly meaner, more loathsome, and once again better developed than almost all of the book's human characters".

Film adaptation 

The Lost World: Jurassic Park is a 1997 science fiction film and sequel to Jurassic Park, loosely based on Crichton's novel. The film was a commercial success, breaking many box-office records when released, but received mixed reviews. It has a number of plot differences from the novel and incorporates scenes from the first novel that were not previously filmed, including the scene with Christina (Novel) / Cathy (Film) Bowman being attacked by Compsognathus.

Prehistoric animals featured
The following prehistoric animals are featured in the novel:
 Apatosaurus
 Carnotaurus
 Hypsilophodon
 Maiasaura – Mislabeled as "Maiasaurus" on novel map.
 Mussaurus
 Ornitholestes
 Pachycephalosaurus – Initially misidentified as Gravitholus.
 Parasaurolophus
 Procompsognathus
 Stegosaurus
 Triceratops
 Tyrannosaurus
 Velociraptor

Indirectly mentioned animals are the following:
 Dryosaurus – Referred to only as "twenty medium-sized dark-green dinosaurs".
 Gallimimus – Mentioned only on document.
 Troodon – Dubious genus mentioned only as "a subspecies of Stenonychosaurus".

References

External links

The Lost World official website

1995 American novels
1995 science fiction novels
Novels about dinosaurs
Living dinosaurs in fiction
Eco-thriller novels
Techno-thriller novels
Action novels
American biopunk novels
Hard science fiction
Jurassic Park novels
Lost world novels
Novels by Michael Crichton
American novels adapted into films
Novels set in Central America
Novels set in Costa Rica
Novels set in New Mexico
Novels set in the San Francisco Bay Area
Novels set on fictional islands
Books with cover art by Chip Kidd
Sequel novels